Calymperaceae is a family of haplolepideous mosses (Dicranidae) in the order Dicranales.

Genera

The family Calymperaceae contains seven genera:

Arthrocormus 
Calymperes 
Exodictyon 
Exostratum 
Leucophanes 
Mitthyridium 
Syrrhopodon 
Calymperites Heinrhichs et al.. Burmese amber, Myanmar, Late Cretaceous (Cenomanian)

References

External links
 

Dicranales
Moss families